Robert Raymond Ness (born May 14, 1935) is an American politician in the state of Minnesota. He served in the Minnesota House of Representatives.

References

Republican Party members of the Minnesota House of Representatives
People from Cass County, Minnesota
People from New Brighton, Minnesota
Bemidji State University alumni
University of Minnesota alumni
1935 births
Living people